KIAM-FM (91.9 FM) is a radio station licensed to serve North Nenana, Alaska. The station is owned by Voice For Christ Ministries, Inc. It airs a Religious radio format as part of the I AM Radio Network.

The station was assigned the KIAM-FM call letters by the Federal Communications Commission on February 26, 2008.

Translators

References

External links
KIAM-FM official website

Radio stations established in 2008
Moody Radio affiliate stations
IAM-FM
2008 establishments in Alaska
Yukon–Koyukuk Census Area, Alaska